The Catholic Archdiocese of Cape Coast is the Metropolitan See for the ecclesiastical province of Cape Coast in Ghana.

History
 27 September 1879: Established as Apostolic Prefecture of Gold Coast from the Apostolic Vicariate of Two Guineas in Gabon 
 25 May 1901: Promoted as Apostolic Vicariate of Gold Coast
 18 April 1950: Promoted as Metropolitan Archdiocese of Cape Coast

The Archdiocese has been generous in supplying priests for underserved areas of the United States; for example, in the Roman Catholic Diocese of Victoria in Texas, 16 of the 64 priests are from Ghana. Many have been incardinated into the archdiocese, have become U.S. citizens, and serve as parish pastors.

Special churches
The seat of the archbishop is St. Francis de Sales Cathedral in Cape Coast.

Bishops
 Vicars Apostolic of Gold Coast
Maximilien Albert, S.M.A. (1895-1903) 
Isidore Klaus, S.M.A. (1904-1905) 
François-Ignace Hummel, S.M.A. (1906-1924) 
Ernest Hauger, S.M.A. (1925-1932)
 Archbishops of Cape Coast
William Porter, S.M.A. (1933-1959) 
John Kodwo Amissah (1959-1991) 
Peter Turkson (1992-2009)
Matthias Kobena Nketsiah (2010-2018)
Charles G. Palmer-Buckle (2018-)

Auxiliary Bishops
John Kodwo Amissah (1957-1959), appointed Archbishop here
Matthias Kobena Nketsiah (2006-2010), appointed Archbishop here

Other priest of this diocese who became bishop
Joseph Amihere Essuah, appointed Bishop of Kumasi in 1962

Suffragan Dioceses
 Sekondi–Takoradi 
 Wiawso

See also
 Catholicism in Ghana

Sources
 GCatholic.org

Cape Coast
Cape Coast
Cape Coast
Religious organizations established in 1879
1879 establishments in Gold Coast (British colony)